Mongar (Dzongkha: མོང་སྒར) is a town and the seat of Mongar District in eastern Bhutan.  it had a population of 3502. Mongar is on the road from Thimphu to Trashigang. It is one of the oldest educational hubs of the country.  It has a regional hospital and a good standard hotel, among other facilities.  The important Yagang Lhakhang monastery is on the outskirts of the town.
The post code for Mongar post office is 43001.

Climate
Mongar features a dry-winter humid subtropical climate (Köppen Cwa).

References

External links
Satellite map at Maplandia.com

Populated places in Bhutan